O.K. Crackerby! is an American television sitcom that aired on ABC from September 16, 1965, to January 6, 1966.

Synopsis
O.K. Crackerby is a billionaire widower from Oklahoma who has three children: 16-year-old Cynthia, 13-year old O. K., Jr., and 9-year-old Hobert. The family moves to Palm Beach, Florida, go to the exclusive Hotel Havenhurst, and discover the staff refuses to rent out the entire penthouse floor to them. Crackerby asks to use the telephone, and in five minutes purchases the hotel, which he renames Havenhurst-Crackerby, and the family turns the penthouse floor into their new home.

Crackerby wants his children to be able to fit into high society so he hires an impoverished Harvard graduate St. John Quincy (who pronounces his name Sihn-Jihn-Kwihn-zee) as a tutor. Quincy initially turned down the job, but accepted it after Crackerby deposited $5,000 into his bank account, provided him with a chauffeur-driven limousine, bought the sporting goods store Quincy worked at, and had him fired. Throughout the short-lived series Crackerby and Quincy alternate between verbally fighting over differing moral values and banding together to battle those they both consider social snobs.

Other recurring characters are Susan, Quincy’s girl friend, and Slim, an employee back at the Oklahoma ranch. Slim spends most of his time in an office, complete with a bed and refrigerator, so he can stay near the phone in order to fulfill Crackerby’s orders within five minutes. He even has a massive 1960s-style mainframe computer to provide any information his boss may need.

Cast
Burl Ives as O.K. Crackerby
Hal Buckley as St. John Quincy
Brooke Adams as Cynthia Crackerby
Brian Corcoran as O.K. Crackerby Jr.
Joel Davidson as Hobart Crackerby
Dick Foran as Slim

Low ratings and cancellation
Nielsen ratings ranked the series as 71st out of 102 evening television  programs, but before ABC could announce its cancellation Burl Ives sent out letters to newspaper columnists stating "O. K. Crackerby is over"… as "the show never did get off the ground in the script department."  The last episode of the series was broadcast on January 6, 1966.

Episodes

References

1965 American television series debuts
1966 American television series endings
1960s American sitcoms
American Broadcasting Company original programming
Television series about families
English-language television shows